The Siskiwit River is a  stream on Isle Royale in Lake Superior, in the U.S. state of Michigan. It forms the outlet of Siskiwit Lake and drops  over its short course, dropping over Siskiwit Falls and entering Lake Superior at Malone Bay.

See also
List of rivers of Michigan

References

Michigan  Streamflow Data from the USGS

Rivers of Michigan
Tributaries of Lake Superior
Isle Royale